Fendiline is a nonselective calcium channel blocker.

References 

Calcium channel blockers
Amines